Celebrity Big Brother, also known as Big Brother: Celebrity Edition, is a spin-off series of the American version of the Dutch reality television franchise Big Brother. This season aired during the winter of the 2017–18 network television season on CBS and was the second U.S. Big Brother season to air outside the usual summer television season, the first being Big Brother 9 in 2008. Julie Chen returned as host, with Allison Grodner and Rich Meehan returning as executive producers. The series is produced by Fly on the Wall Entertainment in association with Endemol Shine North America. The first season premiered on February 7, 2018.

The promotional logo was released on December 20, 2017. The logo is similar to that used for Big Brother 19, with the word "celebrity" added. The first teaser was also released the same day. In January 2018 official photos of the house and backyard were released through a press release and an Instagram livestream with Julie Chen. On January 28, 2018, the official cast was announced during the 60th Annual Grammy Awards.

The first season officially concluded on February 25, 2018 when Marissa Jaret Winokur beat Ross Mathews by a final jury vote of 6 to 3. Ross was also later named America's Favorite HouseGuest.

On May 12, 2018, CBS renewed the spin-off for a second season.

Background
After the first season of the British version of Big Brother proved to be a success in the ratings for Channel 4, the network collaborated with the BBC for the first British season of Celebrity Big Brother in aid of Comic Relief. The season ran for a condensed run of eight days and featured six British celebrities moving into the house used for the first British season. Due to the success of the first celebrity edition, a second season was ordered and shown exclusively on Channel 4 in November 2002. The celebrity version took a two-year break before returning for its third season in 2005, and became a regular staple alongside the regular British version. Starting with the third season, the show began to feature celebrities outside the United Kingdom alongside well known British celebrities. Many notable American celebrities have since taken part in the British version of Celebrity Big Brother. American actor Gary Busey took part in the fourteenth season in the summer of 2014 and became the first American celebrity to win Celebrity Big Brother in the United Kingdom.

An American version of Celebrity Big Brother has been speculated since 2002, along with a celebrity version of Survivor.  In an interview, Julie Chen and CBS CEO Leslie Moonves revealed talks of a celebrity edition of Big Brother as far back as Big Brother 2. It was rumored that CBS was looking to air a celebrity edition in the fall after Big Brother 3 with radio personality Howard Stern speculated as a possible houseguest. Chen revealed that Paris Hilton had agreed to do it and Roseanne Barr initially agreed to take part, but then backed out. Barr would later take part in another celebrity spin-off of Big Brother called Big Brother: Celebrity Hijack in the United Kingdom in 2008, where she watched over a group of non-celebrity housemates for a day, set tasks and talked to them in the Diary Room.

Julie Chen announced on September 7, 2017, during a live double eviction episode of Big Brother 19 that Celebrity Big Brother would air sometime during the winter, before the twentieth season of Big Brother in the summer of 2018. CBS later confirmed via a press release that Julie Chen would return to host the new season, and Allison Grodner and Rich Meehan will be executive producers. The season will be produced by Fly on the Wall Entertainment in association with Endemol Shine North America.

On September 13, 2017, it was revealed by Chen that her husband, CBS chief executive Leslie Moonves, forced her to take a pay cut for the celebrity edition to happen. Moonves stated, "You shouldn't be expected to be paid as if it's a full series. It's a condensed version."

Production
The format of the show remained similar to the American version of Big Brother. Competitions for Head of Household and Power of Veto had been confirmed to returned for this edition along with live evictions. On December 1, 2017, CBS revealed that the series would premiere on February 7, 2018 and wrap on February 25, 2018.

Series changes
Celebrity Big Brother was a condensed version of the game and would not last as long as a regular season of Big Brother, with episodes only shown over two weeks instead of three months. Unlike the parent series Jury members were not sequestered separately and were allowed to return to the outside world as well as watch the show. Beginning with an incident that led to a lawsuit in Big Brother 2 when HouseGuest Justin Sebik got drunk and threatened fellow HouseGuest Krista Stegall by holding a knife to her throat, there has been an alcohol restriction in the house. The alcohol restriction was lifted for the Celebrity HouseGuests. The space in the backyard was reduced to allow production to constantly perform construction for competitions but still allow 24/7 access for the HouseGuests. For the celebrity version of America's Favorite HouseGuest, the term Favorite Celebrity HouseGuest was also being used interchangeably. For the first time since the beginning of the U.S. series, five players were featured in the season's finale night versus the usual three.

Broadcasts
The main television coverage of Celebrity Big Brother was screened on CBS during the winter of the 2017–18 network television season. CBS decided to schedule the spin-off during the February 2018 sweeps period to counterprogram NBC's coverage of the 2018 Winter Olympics. Episodes aired on Sundays, Mondays, Wednesdays, and Fridays with two special episodes on Thursday, February 8 and Saturday, February 24. Most episodes aired for one hour and aired from 8:00–9:00 p.m. EST; the Friday episodes and the season finale, however, ran for two hours each (from 8:00–10:00 p.m. EST). The live Internet feeds returned for the American version of Celebrity Big Brother as part of CBS All Access. Alongside the weekly shows on CBS, the companion series Big Brother: After Dark returned on Pop under the title Celebrity Big Brother: After Dark. The show provided live coverage nightly from inside the House.

International broadcasts

Global announced on December 20, 2017 that the broadcaster had acquired the rights to air Celebrity Big Brother in Canada. Global has broadcast the American version of Big Brother since its launch in 2000. Nine Network confirmed they would air the season in Australia under the name Celebrity Big Brother U.S.. Nine created a special logo for the show resembling the eye logo of the ninth through eleventh seasons of Australian adaption that previously aired on the network. Episodes were "fast-tracked" and available on their streaming service 9Now shortly after their American airing with televised broadcast on 9Go! starting February 11, 2018. Due to low ratings episodes were moved from the 9:30pm timeslot to 11:30pm effective February 14, 2018. 

Endemol Shine also screened the season on their YouTube channel Big Brother Universe outside the United States. The program was not available on the platform in Africa, Australia, Brazil, Bulgaria, Canada, Germany, India, United Kingdom, and the United States due to existing contractual agreements in those territories.

Prize
The HouseGuests competed for the main grand prize of $250,000.

HouseGuests

The HouseGuests were revealed during a live pre-show of the 2018 Grammy Awards on January 28, 2018.

Notes

Future appearances
For the twentieth season of the regular edition Ross Mathews and Marissa Jaret Winokur began hosting an aftershow entitled Off the Block with Ross and Marissa. Marissa Jaret Winokur, Omarosa, Ross Mathews, Metta World Peace, and Mark McGrath all appeared in the second celebrity season; Omarosa hosted a Head of Household competition while Ross and Metta participated in a Power of Veto competition. Mark appeared in the recap episode as a special guest. In 2021, Omarosa competed on Big Brother VIP, the celebrity edition of Australian Big Brother.

Episodes

Voting history

Notes

Viewing figures

References

External links 
 

2018 American television seasons
Big Brother (American TV series)
United States 01